Lampropelma is a genus of Indonesian tarantulas that was first described by Eugène Louis Simon in 1892.  it contains two species, found in Indonesia.

Diagnosis 
They can be distinguished from Phormingochilus and Omothymus though to the apical swelling of the embolus, which then narrows to a point in the apex. Furthermore their distribution can be used as an identifying factor, as they are only found in Indonesia.

Species 
, this genus owns two species, both being found in Indonesia.

 Lampropelma carpenteri (Smith & Jacobi, 2015) - Borneo, Indonesia
 Lampropelma nigerrimum Simon, 1892 - Indonesia

In synonymy 
 Lampropelma kirki (Smith & Jacobi, 2015) = Lampropelma carpenteri

Transferred to other genera 

 Lampropelma nigerrimum arboricola Schmidt & Barensteiner, 2015 → Phormingochilus arboricola
 Lampropelma violaceopes Abraham, 1924 → Omothymus violaceopes

See also
 List of Theraphosidae species

References

Theraphosidae genera
Spiders of Asia
Theraphosidae